Daniel Kahikina Akaka (September 11, 1924 – April 6, 2018) was an American educator and politician who served as a United States Senator from Hawaii from 1990 to 2013. A member of the Democratic Party, Akaka was the first U.S. Senator of Native Hawaiian ancestry.

Born in Honolulu, he served in the U.S. Army Corps of Engineers during World War II. He attended the University of Hawaii, where he received his bachelor's and master's degrees. Originally a high school teacher, Akaka went on to serve as a principal for six years. In 1969, the Department of Education hired him as a chief program planner. In the 1970s, he served in various governmental positions.

Akaka was first elected to the United States House of Representatives in 1976 to represent Hawaii's 2nd congressional district; he served for 13 years. In 1990, he was appointed to the U.S. Senate to succeed the deceased Spark Matsunaga, subsequently winning the special election to complete Matsunaga's term. He would later be reelected to three full terms. In March 2011, he announced he would not run for reelection in 2012.

After fellow U.S. Senator Daniel Inouye died on December 17, 2012, Akaka became the state's senior senator for 2 weeks until he left office on January 3, 2013. He was succeeded by fellow Democrat Mazie Hirono.

Early life, family, and education

Daniel Kahikina Akaka was born in Honolulu, the son of Annie (née Kahoa) and Kahikina Akaka. His paternal grandfather was born in Swatow, Canton, China during the late Qing Dynasty, and his other grandparents were of Native Hawaiian descent. His brother was Rev. Abraham Akaka.

Akaka described Hawaiian as his "native tongue".

Akaka graduated from Kamehameha Schools in 1942. During World War II he served in the United States Army Corps of Engineers, including service on Saipan and Tinian. He served from 1945 to 1947. He worked as a welder and a mechanic and in 1948 was a first mate on the schooner Morning Star.

Akaka married Mary Mildred "Millie" Chong on May 22, 1948. The Akakas had five children.

Entering college (funded by the G.I. Bill), Akaka earned a Bachelor of Education in 1952 from the University of Hawaii. He later received a Master of Education from the same school in 1966.

Early career
Akaka worked as a high school teacher in Honolulu from 1953 until 1960, when he was hired as a vice principal.  In 1963, he became head principal.

In 1969, the Department of Health, Education and Welfare hired Akaka as a chief program planner. Akaka then continued working in government, holding positions as director of the Hawaii Office of Economic Opportunity, human resources assistant for Governor George Ariyoshi and director of the Progressive Neighborhoods Program.

U.S. House of Representatives

Akaka was first elected to the United States House of Representatives in 1976 to represent , comprising all of the state outside the inner ring of Honolulu. He was reelected seven times, all by wide margins.

U.S. Senate (1990-2013)

Elections

Akaka was appointed by Governor John Waihee to the U.S. Senate in April 1990 to serve temporarily after the death of Senator Spark Matsunaga. In November of the same year, he was elected to complete the remaining four years of Matsunaga's unexpired term, defeating U.S. Representative Pat Saiki with 53% of the vote. He was reelected in 1994 for a full six-year term with over 70% of the vote. He was reelected almost as easily in 2000.

For the 2006 election, he overcame a strong primary challenge from U.S. Representative Ed Case, then won a third full term with 61 percent of the vote, defeating Cynthia Thielen.

Tenure
During his Senate tenure, Akaka served as the Chair of the United States Senate Committee on Indian Affairs and the United States Senate Committee on Veterans' Affairs.

In 1996, Akaka sponsored legislation that led to nearly two-dozen Medals of Honor being belatedly awarded to Asian-American soldiers in the 442nd Regimental Combat Team and the 100th Infantry Battalion.  He also passed legislation compensating Philippine Scouts who were refused veterans benefits.

From 2000 until his retirement from the Senate in 2013, Akaka sponsored legislation, known as the Akaka Bill, to afford sovereignty to Native Hawaiians. In 2005, Akaka acknowledged in an interview with NPR that the Akaka Bill could eventually result in outright independence.

The Akaka Bill has been supported as a means of restoring Hawaiian self-determination lost with the 1893 overthrow of the Kingdom of Hawaii, and would include giving up the ability to sue for sovereignty in federal courts in exchange for recognition by the federal government (but would not block sovereignty claims made under international law.)  The bill has been criticized as discriminating on the basis on ethnic origin in that only Native Hawaiians would be permitted to participate in the governing entity that the bill would establish.

In October 2002, Akaka voted against authorizing the use of military force against Iraq.

In April 2006, he was selected by Time as one of America's Five Worst Senators. The article criticized him for mainly authoring minor legislation, calling him "master of the minor resolution and the bill that dies in committee".

In February 2009, a bill was authored in the Philippine House of Representatives by Rep. Antonio Diaz seeking to confer honorary Filipino citizenship on Akaka, Senators Daniel Inouye and Ted Stevens and Representative Bob Filner, for their role in securing the passage of benefits for Filipino World War II veterans.

On March 2, 2011, Akaka announced he would not be running for re-election in the 2012 U.S. Senate elections. The 88-year-old Akaka attended his final session in the Senate on December 12, 2012.  He closed his speech with a traditional Hawaiian farewell, "a hui hou" (until we meet again).

Committee assignments

Committee on Armed Services
Subcommittee on Personnel
Subcommittee on Readiness and Management Support
Subcommittee on SeaPower
Committee on Banking, Housing, and Urban Affairs
Subcommittee on Housing, Transportation, and Community Development
Subcommittee on Financial Institutions
Subcommittee on Securities, Insurance, and Investment
Committee on Homeland Security and Governmental Affairs
Subcommittee on Federal Financial Management, Government Information and International Security
Subcommittee on Oversight of Government Management, the Federal Workforce and the District of Columbia (Chairman)
Ad Hoc Subcommittee on State, Local, and Private Sector Preparedness and Integration
Committee on Indian Affairs (Chairman)
Committee on Veterans' Affairs
Congressional Task Force on Native Hawaiian Issues (Chairman)

Caucus memberships

Congressional Asian Pacific American Caucus
Congressional Biotechnology Caucus
Congressional Postal Caucus (Vice Chair)
International Conservation Caucus
Senate Anti-Meth Caucus
Senate Army Caucus (Co-Chair)
Senate Sweetener Caucus (Co-Chair)
Senate Oceans Caucus

Death
Akaka died of organ failure in the early hours of April 6, 2018, at the age of 93.  Former president Barack Obama remembered Akaka as "a tireless advocate for working people, veterans, native Hawaiian rights, and the people of Hawaii. .. He embodied the aloha spirit with compassion and care."

Electoral history

See also
List of Asian Americans and Pacific Islands Americans in the United States Congress
List of members of the 110th United States Congress who have served in the United States military

References

External links

 
 

|-

|-

|-

|-

1924 births
2018 deaths
21st-century American politicians
American military personnel of Chinese descent
American military personnel of Native Hawaiian descent
American people of Native Hawaiian descent
United States Army personnel of World War II
Hawaii politicians of Chinese descent
Schoolteachers from Hawaii
Democratic Party members of the United States House of Representatives from Hawaii
Democratic Party United States senators from Hawaii
Hōkūleʻa
Kamehameha Schools alumni
Members of the United States Congress of Chinese descent
Asian-American members of the United States House of Representatives
Asian-American United States senators
Military personnel from Hawaii
Native Hawaiian politicians
Politicians from Honolulu
State cabinet secretaries of Hawaii
United Church of Christ members
United States Army Corps of Engineers personnel
United States Army non-commissioned officers
University of Hawaiʻi at Mānoa alumni
Hawaii people of Chinese descent
Akaka family
Deaths from organ failure
Burials in the National Memorial Cemetery of the Pacific